Lenny Rush is a British child actor. He is best known for his work on the Daisy May Cooper comedy drama series Am I Being Unreasonable? and on the BBC One series Dodger. He received  a breakthrough award at the 2023 National Comedy Awards.

Early life
Born to Steve and Lisa Rush, Lenny is from Burnham-on-Crouch, Essex where he attends Ormiston Rivers Academy.

Career
Rush first appeared on camera on the CBeebies docu-soap Our Family. He began acting locally at the Pauline Quirke Academy in Essex. He played roles on CBeebies series Apple Tree House and The Dumping Ground and had played Tiny Tim in versions of A Christmas Carol on both stage at The Old Vic in London in 2017 and 2018, and on-screen in a Steven Knight televised retelling of the Charles Dickens classic in 2019.

After these roles, Rush was given series regular roles in the comedy drama Dodger alongside Christopher Eccleston. Initially a small role called The Sweeper, the part was expanded for Rush and given the character name Morgan. Rush also had the role of Ollie, the son of Daisy May Cooper’s character, in BBC One comedy Am I Being Unreasonable? in which he was able to improvise as well as perform lines.
He received praise for his performance in the show with Lucy Mangan writing in The Guardian “What a gift they have in Rush, who has the comic chops and emotional range of an actor twice his age, and the kind of chemistry with Cooper that is an absolute joy to watch."

He also made a notable appearance on BBC One charity money-raising show Children In Need in 2022.

Rush was nominated for the Breakthrough Award, and Comedy Performance (Male) Award, for Am I Being Unreasonable? at the Royal Television Society Programme Awards in March 2023.

Accolades
Rush was voted Best Breakthrough at the I Talk Telly Awards in December 2022. It was announced in January 2023 that Rush would be receiving a breakthrough award at the 2023 National Comedy Awards.

Personal life
Rush has a condition called Spondyloepiphyseal dysplasia congenita, a condition that affects his growth, resulting in dwarfism.

Filmography

References

External links

Year of birth missing (living people)
Living people
People from Burnham-on-Crouch
British male child actors